Lachlan Duff Gordon-Duff (1 June 1817 – 10 January 1892) was a British politician. He was elected as a Member of Parliament for Banffshire in 1857 and resigned through appointment as Steward of the Chiltern Hundreds on 22 April 1861.

He was the son of Thomas Duff Gordon (1790–1855) and Joanna Maria Grant (1798–1872), daughter of David McDowall-Grant and Mary Eleanor Macdowall Grant.

He married Jane Butterfield, daughter of Thomas Butterfield, Chief Justice of Bermuda, on 6 April 1847.

He died at Drummuir Castle and is buried at Ordiquhill.

References

External links 
 

1817 births
1892 deaths
Members of the Parliament of the United Kingdom for Scottish constituencies
Scottish Liberal Party MPs
UK MPs 1857–1859
UK MPs 1859–1865